She's So Hard is the second EP recorded and released by Australian four-piece musical group The Jezabels. It was released independently on 6 November 2009 through MGM Distribution.

The single "Easy To Love" came in at number 49 in the Triple J Hottest 100, 2010.

Track listing
All tracks written by Hayley Mary, Heather Shannon, Sam Lockwood, and Nik Kaloper

References

2009 EPs
The Jezabels albums